Anadynata was a town of ancient Paphlagonia, inhabited in Byzantine times. 

Its site is located near Kurşunlu, Asiatic Turkey.

References

Populated places in ancient Paphlagonia
Former populated places in Turkey
Populated places of the Byzantine Empire
History of Çankırı Province